Lamproderma is a genus of slime molds in the family Lamprodermataceae. As of 2015, there are 46 species in the genus.

Species

Lamproderma acanthosporum
Lamproderma aeneum
Lamproderma alexopouli
Lamproderma anglicum
Lamproderma arcyrioides
Lamproderma argenteobrunneum
Lamproderma cacographicum
Lamproderma collinsii
Lamproderma columbinum
Lamproderma cristatum
Lamproderma cucumer
Lamproderma debile
Lamproderma disseminatum
Lamproderma echinosporum
Lamproderma echinulatum
Lamproderma elasticum
Lamproderma granulosum
Lamproderma griseum
Lamproderma gulielmae
Lamproderma hieroglyphicum
Lamproderma kowalskii
Lamproderma latifilum
Lamproderma laxum
Lamproderma lycopodiicola
Lamproderma maculatum
Lamproderma magniretisporum
Lamproderma meyerianum
Lamproderma mucronatum
Lamproderma muscorum
Lamproderma nordica
Lamproderma ovoideoechinulatum
Lamproderma ovoideum
Lamproderma piriforme
Lamproderma pseudomaculatum
Lamproderma pulchellum
Lamproderma pulveratum
Lamproderma puncticulatum
Lamproderma retirugisporum
Lamproderma sauteri
Lamproderma scintillans
Lamproderma spinulosporum
Lamproderma splendens
Lamproderma thindianum
Lamproderma tuberculosporum
Lamproderma verrucosum
Lamproderma zonatum

References

Myxogastria
Amoebozoa genera